Harry Dodgshun Bedford (31 August 1877 – 17 February 1918) was a New Zealand university academic and Member of Parliament for the City of Dunedin.

Biography

Early life
Bedford was born in Hunslet, a suburb of Leeds, Yorkshire, England, in 1877. Alongside his four sisters and together with their mother, they emigrated to Invercargill in 1886 to reunite with his father. He received further education at Clifton School and left after Standard 6 (year 8) to work for his father's tailoring business. He completed a PhD at the University of Otago in 1916, with a thesis on the history of banking in New Zealand. He later became a professor of history and economics at the University of Otago in Dunedin. He married Ella Brown in 1907. One of their four children, John Dodgshun Bedford (born 1916), was the father of the human geographer Richard Bedford.

Member of Parliament

Harry Bedford represented one of the multi-member City of Dunedin seats in the New Zealand Parliament from 1902 to 1905.

Bedford was an Independent Liberal in 1902 topped the poll for Dunedin City with 10,088 votes. He became the sensation of the 1902 election: a political novice who had obtained the highest individual vote ever recorded in New Zealand. The Lyttelton Times described him as "the 'idol of Dunedin' ... young, good-looking, able, earnest, energetic and highly attractive as a speaker". In , Bedford stood for the new seat of Dunedin North but was not successful.

The seat was held by John Millar on the second ballot. Harry Bedford joined the United Labour Party in 1912.

Death
Bedford drowned while swimming at Whangarei on 17 February 1918.

Books

References

Further reading

1877 births
1918 deaths
Independent MPs of New Zealand
New Zealand Liberal Party MPs
New Zealand educators
English emigrants to New Zealand
People from Leeds
University of Auckland alumni
University of Otago alumni
Academic staff of the University of Otago
Victoria University of Wellington alumni
New Liberal Party (New Zealand) politicians
United Labour Party (New Zealand) politicians
New Zealand MPs for Dunedin electorates
Unsuccessful candidates in the 1905 New Zealand general election
Unsuccessful candidates in the 1911 New Zealand general election
Members of the New Zealand House of Representatives
Deaths by drowning in New Zealand